Romano Scarpa (September 27, 1927 – April 23, 2005) was one of the most famous Italian creators of Disney comics.

Biography
Growing up in Venice he developed a particular love for American cartoons and Disney comics, that, at the time, were published in the big format of the Topolino giornale which was then printing now classic Floyd Gottfredson's stories. In the 1940s he opened an Animation Studio in Venice in which he produced his first works: some commercials, a short titled E poi venne il diluvio and another one titled La piccola fiammiferaia (1953, based on Hans Christian Andersen's The Little Match Girl), distributed in Italy together with Robert Aldrich's Attack! (1956).

Right after that he stopped working in animation for a while and dedicated wholly to creating Disney comics. When in 1956 Italian editors had no more new Floyd Gottfredson's stories to reprint, he was given the responsibility to continue Gottfredson's stories about Mickey Mouse. Also influenced by Carl Barks in the late 1950s and up to about 1963 he wrote and penciled stories like Topolino e la collana Chirikawa (1960) or The Flying Scot (1957) that have, later, been translated in many different languages throughout the world. Many of these stories have their backgrounds in movies, for example Topolino nel favoloso regno di Shan Grillà (1961) is based upon Frank Capra's Lost Horizon (1937); not to talk about all the stories starring Snow White or the Seven Dwarfs, obviously based on Snow White and the Seven Dwarfs (1937). Sometimes the exact opposite happened; the Italian movie Riusciranno i nostri eroi a ritrovare l'amico misteriosamente scomparso in Africa? (1968) is based on Scarpa's story Topolino e il Pippotarzan (1957).

Around 1963, Scarpa stopped writing for 6 or 7 years. In the 1970s, he moved to Spain and started working for a different publisher. Among the last things he made while he was still in Italy, at the end of the 1980s and at beginning of the 1990s, there are the so-called Paperolimpiadi (a long story about the 1988 Seoul Olympic games) and some strip stories, the same kind of stories that he loved when he was a child. One of these, Topolino e l'enigma di Brigaboom (1989) was partially based on Brigadoon (1954).

In the meanwhile he has had time enough for some more animation, so we have Aihnoo degli Icebergs (1972), The Fourth King (1977) and a new TV series, The Adventures of Marco and Gina (Sopra i tetti di Venezia) (2001).

Scarpa mainly worked on Disney comics, but he was also able to work on non-Disney material once in a while, so he did one (Rolf Kauka's) Lupo story and one (Hannah and Barbera's) Yogi Bear story. In the 1950s he also drew some Angelino stories, and Italian character.

Since 1988 some of his comic stories have been published in the US by Gladstone Publishing; it was the first time that this happened to an Italian Disney author. Later, when Disney Comics took Gladstone's place; they published some more of his stories, and in 2003, the same happened with Gemstone Publishing, that is publishing his stories in the US at the moment.

He has influenced many younger creators (Giorgio Cavazzano was his inker during the Sixties) and many have attempted to imitate his style.

Disney characters created by Romano Scarpa
In his career Scarpa created many Disney characters that are now accepted by some as part of the Disney Universe. Those include, but are not limited to:

Brigitta MacBridge, Scrooge McDuck's self-appointed girlfriend with whom she shares a love/hate relationship;
Ellroy (Italian: Bruto), Ellsworth's adopted son;
Dickie Duck (Italian: Paperetta Yé-Yé), a dynamic female teenage duck who was introduced as the granddaughter of "Glittering" Goldie O'Gilt;
Gideon McDuck (Italian: Gedeone de' Paperoni), a newspaper editor and Scrooge's brother;
Jubal Pomp (Italian: Filo Sganga), an unlucky wanna-be businessman always trying to imitate Scrooge and failing miserably;
Kildare Coot (Italian: Sgrizzo Papero), a crazy cousin of Donald Duck's;
Portis (Italian: Plottigat), Black Pete's cousin, a genius of crime;
Trudy Van Tubb, Black Pete's mate and accomplice in crime.

Reprints

In 2017 Fantagraphics Books published a collection containing four stories of Scarpa's Snow White comics, titled The Return of Snow-White and the Seven Dwarfs, ISBN .

In 2018 Fantagraphics Books began publishing a hardcover series titled Disney Masters, in which Romano Scarpa has to date (October 2019) had three volumes dedicated to his Disney works.

 Mickey Mouse: The Delta Dimension (2018) ISBN 
 Mickey Mouse: The Phantom Blot's Double Mystery (2018) ISBN 
 Donald Duck: Duck Avenger Strikes Again (2019) ISBN 
 Mickey Mouse: The Man from Altacraz (2021) ISBN

Index of comics books published in the United States
This is an index of all Romano Scarpa comics published in the US. Only Duck universe and Mouse universe are listed. Chip and Dale comics are not listed.

References

Citations

Sources
Romano Scarpa – Un cartoonist italiano tra animazione e fumetti, by Luca Boschi, Leonardo Gori and Andrea Sani. Alessandro distribuzioni, 1988.
Romano Scarpa – Sognando la Calidornia by Luca Boschi, Leonardo Gori, Andrea Sani and Alberto Becattini. Vittorio Pavesio productions, 2001 (in Italian);
I Disney Italiani by Luca Boschi, Leonardo Gori and Andrea Sani. Granata Press, 1990.

External links

 Romano Scarpa at the Lambiek Comiclopedia
 The Last Balaboo, site completely about Scarpa, with drawings, covers, sketches, indexes, biography and much more (currently temporarily closed, but there's a message board available for anyone willing to share their feelings about the loss, the messages will be collected and sent to Scarpa's family);
 Frank Stajano's page on Scarpa, with a detailed analysis of the different Scarpa's art's periods.

1927 births
2005 deaths
Italian comics artists
Italian comics writers
Disney comics writers
Disney comics artists